The Salute Tour was the second concert tour held by British girl group Little Mix, in support of their second studio album, Salute. The tour began on 16 May 2014, in Birmingham, England, and ended on 27 July 2014 in Scarborough, North Yorkshire, England. 

The Salute Tour marked the first time that the group would headlined arenas on selected dates. The tour consisted of 20 sold-out shows across the United Kingdom and Ireland and grossed over $10.6 million. The group was also scheduled to expand their tour in North America starting in Boca Raton, Florida and would conclude in Toronto, Canada. However, in July 2014, the North American leg of the tour was later cancelled so the group could work on their third album.

Background
The tour was officially announced on 2 December 2013 through the band's Twitter and  tickets were available starting 6 December 2013.

Due to overwhelming demand, second dates were added at the Glasgow Clyde Auditorium and the Cardiff Motorpoint Arena in December 2013. Also, due to exceptional public demand, the Manchester venue was upgraded from the O2 Apollo Manchester to the Manchester Arena. The Nottingham show was also relocated from the Nottingham Royal Concert Hall on 5 June, to the Capital FM Arena on 28 May.

A North America leg of the tour was announced on 21 April 2014, with general public tickets going on sale 26 April 2014 and pre sale beginning 23 April 2014.

On 4 July 2014, Little Mix released a statement on their website, indicating the cancellation of the then-upcoming North American leg of the tour, due to wanting to be in the process of the creation of their third album.

Supporting acts
 M.O (UK and Ireland)
 HRVY (UK and Ireland)
 NVS (UK and Ireland)

Setlist

Act 1
"Salute"
"Nothing Feels Like You"
"About The Boy" 
"Change Your Life" 
"Dark Horse" 
Act 2 
"A Different Beat" 
"How Ya Doin'?" 
"Mr Loverboy"
"Boy" 
"Towers" 
"Competition"
"Word Up!"
Act 3 
"DNA" 
"Stand Down" 
"Talk Dirty / Can't Hold Us" 
"Little Me" 
"Move"
Encore 
"Good Enough"
"Wings"

Tour dates

Cancelled shows

References

2014 concert tours
Little Mix concert tours